Luis Antonio Andreuchi (born 17 September 1955 in Monte Buey) is a retired football player from Argentina.

He played as a forward and he began his career from Altos Hornos Zapla. He has won 2 times the Argentine Primera División as a player of Quilmes and Ferro Carril Oeste. He was the top scorer in the 1978 Argentine Primera División scoring 22 goals in 40 matches equalizing with Diego Maradona.

Titles
 Quilmes Atlético Club
Primera División Argentina: 1978
 Club Ferro Carril Oeste
Primera División Argentina: 1982

Honours
 Quilmes Atlético Club
Top scorer - Primera División Argentina: 1978

References

External links

Club Almirante Brown footballers
Quilmes Atlético Club footballers
Club Atlético Banfield footballers
Unión de Santa Fe footballers
Panathinaikos F.C. players
Ferro Carril Oeste footballers
Argentine expatriate footballers
Argentine footballers
1955 births
Living people
Association football forwards
Sportspeople from Córdoba Province, Argentina